Aberdylais halt railway station served the village of Aberdulais in Wales. It was located on the line from Neath to Merthyr Tydfil.

History

Opened by the Vale of Neath Railway, it became part of the Great Western Railway. The line then passed on to the Western Region of British Railways on nationalisation in 1948. Renamed by the British Transport Commission, it was then closed by the British Railways Board.

The site today

Station Road marks the site of the former railway station, now home to the local branch of the Royal British Legion.

References 

 GWR network diagram around Neath

Disused railway stations in Neath Port Talbot
Former Great Western Railway stations
Railway stations in Great Britain opened in 1851
Railway stations in Great Britain closed in 1964